Ornipholidotos nguru is a butterfly in the family Lycaenidae. It is found in Tanzania. The habitat consists of submontane evergreen forests.

References

Butterflies described in 1987
Ornipholidotos
Endemic fauna of Tanzania
Butterflies of Africa